Thomas Bill Kornberg is an American biochemist who was the first person to purify and characterise DNA polymerase II and DNA polymerase III. He is currently a professor of biochemistry and biophysics at the University of California, San Francisco, and is working on Drosophila melanogaster development.

Kornberg's father was Arthur Kornberg (1918–2007), winner of the 1959 Nobel Prize in Medicine, and his older brother is Roger D. Kornberg (born 1947), winner of the 2006 Nobel Prize in Chemistry. His mother was biochemist Sylvy Kornberg.

References

Bibliography

External links
Thomas Kornberg and Emanuel Ax: Scientist and Musician- Beethoven’s Cello Sonata No. 3 in A major, 1st movement

1948 births
Living people
American biochemists
Jewish American scientists
University of California, San Francisco faculty
Scientists from St. Louis
Columbia College (New York) alumni
21st-century American Jews